Rod Frederick Jensen (born 19 January 1979), nicknamed 'Rocket' Rod Jensen, is an Australian former professional rugby league footballer. Jensen had previously played for the Northern Pride in the Queensland Cup, in the United Kingdom for the Huddersfield Giants in the Super League, North Queensland Cowboys in the National Rugby League competition. He also played with the Canberra Raiders for 5 seasons. Jensen started his career at, the now defunct Super League side, the Adelaide Rams in 1997.

Early life 
Jensen was born in Atherton, Queensland, Australia. He attended school at St Augustine's College.

Playing career
Jensen played from the interchange bench in the North Queensland Cowboys' first ever grand final in 2005, which was lost to the Wests Tigers.

Jensen was known for his ability to play many positions with speed and agility and was nicknamed 'Rocket' accordingly. Jensen lived up to his nickname in the closing stages of the 2007 Super League with several length-of-the-field tries including a burst from his own line versus Warrington Wolves where he put himself forward as one of Super League's fastest men by outpacing Kevin Penny who is one of the fastest players in the Super League.

Jensen scored 19 tries for the Northern Pride in the Queensland Cup before his retirement following the conclusion of the 2009 season. Jensen came out of retirement to rejoin the Northern Pride halfway through the 2010 season where the club went on to win the Queensland Cup premiership.
He continued with the Northern Pride club for the 2011 and 2012 season before leaving to take up a position with Mareeba Gladiators.

Post-playing career
Rod Jensen is currently CEO of the Northern Pride club. Jensen is a qualified Teacher and graduated from James Cook University of North Queensland in 2005.

Jensen ran as a candidate in the 2022 Australian federal election to represent the Division of Leichhardt in Far North Queensland. He ran as a candidate for the Katter's Australian Party.

References

External links
Huddersfield sign Cowboys utility

1979 births
Living people
Adelaide Rams players
Australian rugby league players
Australian Aboriginal rugby league team players
Australian expatriate sportspeople in England
Canberra Raiders players
Indigenous Australian rugby league players
North Queensland Cowboys players
Huddersfield Giants players
Northern Pride RLFC players
Rugby league centres
Rugby league wingers
Rugby league second-rows
People from Far North Queensland
James Cook University alumni
Rugby league players from Queensland